The State Peace and Development Council (abbreviated SPDC or) was the official name of the military government of Burma (Myanmar) which, in 1997, succeeded the State Law and Order Restoration Council that seized power under the rule of Saw Maung in 1988. On 30 March 2011, Senior General and Council Chairman Than Shwe signed a decree that officially dissolved the council.

From 1988 to 1997, the junta was known as the State Law and Order Restoration Council (abbreviated SLORC or ), which had succeeded the Pyithu Hluttaw as a legislature and the Council of State as a ruling council, after dissolving the State organs of the Socialist Republic of the Union of Burma. In 1997, SLORC was abolished and reconstituted as the State Peace and Development Council (SPDC). The powerful regional military commanders, who were members of SLORC, were promoted to new positions and transferred to the capital of Rangoon (now Yangon). The new regional military commanders were not included in the membership of the SPDC.

The SPDC consisted of eleven senior military officers. The members of the junta wielded a great deal more power than the cabinet ministers, who were either more-junior military officers or civilians. The exception was the Defence Ministry portfolio, which was in the hands of junta leader Than Shwe himself. On 15 September 1993, it established the Union Solidarity and Development Association which was replaced by Union Solidarity and Development Party on 29 March 2010 in time for the elections.

Although the regime retreated from the totalitarian Burmese Way to Socialism of the BSPP when it took power in 1988, the regime was widely accused of human rights abuses. It rejected the 1990 election results and kept Aung San Suu Kyi under house arrest until her release on 13 November 2010. The way the junta handled Cyclone Nargis was also internationally criticised. The council was officially dissolved on 30 March 2011, with the inauguration of the newly elected government, led by its former member and Prime Minister, President Thein Sein.

History

The State Law and Order Restoration Council was formed when the Burmese Armed Forces, commanded by General Saw Maung (later self-promoted to Senior General Saw Maung, died July 1997), seized power on 18 September 1988 crushing the 8888 Uprising. On the day it seized power SLORC issued Order No.1/1988 stating that the Armed Forces had taken over power and announced the formation of the SLORC. With Order No. 2/1988, the SLORC abolished all organs of state power that were formed under the 1974 Burmese constitution. The Pyithu Hluttaw (the legislature under the 1974 Constitution), the Council of Ministers (the Cabinet), the Council of People's Justices (the Judiciary), the Council of People's Attorneys (the Attorney-General Office), the Council of People's Inspectors (the Auditor-General Office), as well as the State/Region, Township, Ward/Village People's Councils were abolished.

The SLORC also stated that the services of the Deputy Ministers in the previous Burma Socialist Programme Party (BSPP) government which it replaced were also terminated. (Under the 1974 Burmese Constitution the Council of Ministers acted as a Cabinet but since the Deputy Ministers were not considered to be formally part of the Council of Ministers, the SLORC made sure that the Deputy Ministers – together with the Ministers' – services in the previous BSPP government from whom it had taken over power were also terminated.) The Orders that SLORC issued on the day of its takeover can be seen in the 19 September 1988 issue of The Working People's Daily. The first Chairman of SLORC was General Saw Maung, later Senior General, who was also the Prime Minister. He was removed as both Chairman of SLORC and Prime Minister on 23 April 1992 when General Than Shwe, later Senior General, took over both posts from him.

On 15 November 1997, SLORC was abolished and reconstituted as the State Peace and Development Council (SPDC). Most, but not all members of the abolished SLORC, were in the SPDC military regime.

Leadership

Chairmen

Vice Chairmen

Former members
Ordered by protocol:
 Senior General Than Shwe, Chairman of the SPDC, Commander-in-Chief of Defence Services
 Vice Senior General Maung Aye, Deputy Chairman of the SPDC, Deputy Commander-in-Chief of Defence Services, Commander-in-Chief of the Army
 Retired General Thura U Shwe Mann, Former Joint Chief of Staff of the Army, Navy and Air Force
 Retired General U Thein Sein, Prime Minister and former President
 Retired General U Thiha Thura Tin Aung Myint Oo, Secretary-1 of the SPDC, Former Quartermaster General and ex-Vice-president
 Major-General Ohn Myint, Chief of Bureau of Special Operation – 1 (Kachin State, Mandalay Region, Chin State, Sagaing Region)
 Lieutenant-General Min Aung Hlaing, Chief of Bureau of Special Operation – 2 (Shan State, Kayah State)
 Lieutenant-General Ko Ko, Chief of Bureau of Special Operation – 3 (Bago Region, Ayeyarwady Region)
 Lieutenant-General Tha Aye, Chief of Bureau of Special Operation – 4 (Karen State, Mon State, Tanintharyi Region)
 Lieutenant-General Myint Swe, Chief of Bureau of Special Operation – 5 (Yangon Region)
 Lieutenant-General Khin Zaw, Chief of Bureau of Special Operation −6 (Magwe Region, Rakhine State)
 Major-General Hla Htay Win, Chief of Armed Forces Training
 Retired Lieutenant-General U Tin Aye, Former Chief of Military Ordnance, Current Head of Election Council
 Lieutenant-General Thura Myint Aung, Adjutant General

Human rights abuses

Western non-governmental organisations, such as the Burma Campaign UK, the US Campaign for Burma, Amnesty International and Human Rights Watch have made a variety of serious accusations against the SPDC. Reports by these organisations as well as the United Nations and the Karen Human Rights Group alleged gross human rights abuses that took place in Burma under their regime, including:
 Murder and arbitrary executions
 Torture and rape
 Recruitment of child soldiers
 Forced relocations
 Forced labour
 Political imprisonment

Murder

One of the worst atrocities in Burma took place during the uprising of August 1988, when millions of Burmese marched throughout the country calling for an end to military rule. Soldiers shot hundreds of protesters and killed an estimated 3,000 people in the following weeks. During the August and September demonstrations of 2007, at least 184 protesters were shot and killed and many were tortured. Under the SPDC, the Burmese army engaged in military offensives against ethnic minority populations, committing acts that violated international humanitarian law.

Recruitment of child soldiers
It has been alleged that the SPDC forcibly recruited children – some as young as 10 – to serve in its army, the Tatmadaw. It is difficult to estimate the number of child soldiers used to serve in the Burmese army, but there were thousands, according to Human Rights Watch</ref> the Child Soldiers Global Report 2008 and Amnesty International.

The UN Secretary-General named the SPDC in four consecutive reports for violating international standards prohibiting the recruitment and use of child soldiers.

Forced relocations
Human Rights Watch reported that since Cyclone Nargis in May 2008, the Burmese authorities expelled hundreds, if not thousands, of displaced persons from schools, monasteries, and public buildings, and encouraged them to return to their destroyed villages in the Irrawaddy Delta. The authorities emptied some public buildings and schools to use as polling stations for the 24 May referendum on a new constitution, despite pleas from United Nations Secretary-General Ban Ki-moon to postpone the referendum and focus their resources on humanitarian relief. The SPDC was alleged to have evicted people from dozens of government-operated tented relief camps in the vicinity of the former capital Yangon, ordering the residents to return to their homes, regardless of the conditions they face.

The forced evictions were part of government efforts to demonstrate that the emergency relief period was over and that the affected population were capable of rebuilding their lives without foreign aid. People who were forced from their homes by Cyclone Nargis are considered to be internally displaced persons under international law. Under the UN Guiding Principles on Internal Displacement, the Burmese government was urged to ensure the right of "internally displaced persons to return voluntarily, in safety and with dignity, to their homes or places of habitual residence, or to resettle voluntarily in another part of the country."

Forced labour
According to the International Labour Organization (ILO), despite the new quasi-civilian government taking power in Burma, forced labour continues to be widespread in Burma. It is imposed mainly by the military, for portering (that is, carrying of provisions to remote bases, or on military operations), road construction, camp construction and repair, and for a range of other tasks. In March 1997, the European Union withdrew Burma's trade privileges because of the prevalence of forced labour and other abuses. The same year, the ILO established a Commission of Inquiry to look into allegations of forced labour, coming up with a damning report the following year.

In November 2006, the International Labour Organization (ILO) announced it was to seek at the International Criminal Court "to prosecute members of the ruling Myanmar junta for crimes against humanity" over the allegations of forced labour of its citizens by the military. According to the ILO, an estimated 800,000 people are subject to forced labour in Burma.

Political imprisonment
Even before the large-scale demonstrations began in August 2007, the authorities arrested many well-known opponents of the government on political grounds, several of whom had only been released from prison several months earlier. Before the 25–29 September crackdown, more arrests of members of the opposition party National League for Democracy (NLD) took place, which critics say was a pre-emptive measure before the crackdown.

Mass round-ups occurred during the crackdown itself, and the authorities continued to arrest protesters and supporters throughout 2007. Between 3,000 and 4,000 political prisoners were detained, including children and pregnant women, 700 of whom were believed still in detention at year's end. At least 20 were charged and sentenced under anti-terrorism legislation in proceedings which did not meet international fair trial standards. Detainees and defendants were denied the right to legal counsel.

References

External links
 Myanmar.gov: Official State Peace And Development Council (SPDC) website
 Irrawaddy.org: Members of State Peace and Development Council (SPDC)
 Burma Campaign UK

Government of Myanmar
Military dictatorship in Myanmar
Military history of Myanmar
1990s in Myanmar
2000s in Myanmar
2010s in Myanmar
1997 in military history
1997 establishments in Myanmar
2011 disestablishments in Myanmar
History of Myanmar (1948–present)
Internal conflict in Myanmar